DTF may refer to:

Arts and entertainment
 DTF (rap duo), French duo
 "D T F", a song by Adore Delano from the 2014 album Till Death Do Us Party
 , a Russian video game website

Technology
 Dynamic Track Following in Video 2000 videotape
 Digital Tape Format, for magnetic tape storage
 Define the File, DOS macros

Other uses
 Department of Treasury and Finance,  Australia
 Directed Transfer Function, in neurology, based on the Granger causality principle
 Downtown Fullerton, California, US
 Direct to Film, a printing method, similar to DTG (Direct to Garment), print images and designs on substrate or materials other than paper, such as T-shirt, porcelain, etc.